"I'm Your Girl" may refer to:

 a hit Rodgers and Hammerstein song from Me and Juliet
 I'm Your Girl, a song by S.E.S. from Reach Out (S.E.S. album)
 I'm Your Girl (album), an album by S.E.S.
 "I'm Your Girl", 1967 song by Jackie Verdell
 "I'm Your Girl", 2016 song by Dove Cameron and Sofia Carson